The Aviv Dubai Championship was a professional golf tournament held on the Fire course at the Jumeirah Golf Estates, in Dubai, United Arab Emirates.

The tournament was slotted into the 2020 season as the penultimate event, with the season-ending DP World Tour Championship, Dubai following the week after on the Earth course at the same venue. It was originally intended to be a one-off event.

Antoine Rozner won the inaugural event with a 25-under-par 263 total. He shot a final round 64 to jump ahead of overnight leader Andy Sullivan; who shot a 61 in the first round.

The event returned in the 2021 season and was sponsored by Aviv Clinics. Again it was the penultimate event to the DP World Tour Championship, Dubai.

Winners

References

External links
Coverage on European Tour official site

Former European Tour events
Golf tournaments in the United Arab Emirates
Sports competitions in Dubai
Autumn events in the United Arab Emirates